Smeringocera is a genus of beetles in the family Carabidae, containing the following species:

 Smeringocera baenningeri Liebke, 1929
 Smeringocera convexa Mateu, 1966
 Smeringocera gestroi Alluaud, 1914
 Smeringocera lineola (Dejean, 1831)
 Smeringocera mashuna (Peringuey, 1896)
 Smeringocera nigeriana Liebke, 1938

References

Lebiinae